WQNH-LP (94.7 FM, "WQNH Quality 94.7 FM") is a radio station licensed to serve the community of Deerfield, New Hampshire. The station is owned by New Hampshire Community Radio Inc, and airs a classic hits format.

The station was assigned the WQNH-LP call letters by the Federal Communications Commission on November 3, 2015.

References

External links
 Official Website
 FCC Public Inspection File for WQNH-LP
 

QNH-LP
QNH-LP
Radio stations established in 2017
2017 establishments in New Hampshire
Classic hits radio stations in the United States
Rockingham County, New Hampshire